Arne Henriksen (born 26 February 1944) is a Norwegian architect who has designed many Norwegian railway stations. He worked at NSB Arkitektkontor from 1975 til 1989, and thereafter in private practice. He is a three-time winner of the Houen Fund Certificate for outstanding architecture, awarded by the National Association of Norwegian Architects.

Stations he designed
 Holmlia Station (1982)
 Frognerseteren Station (1993)
 Slependen Station (1993)
 Lillestrøm Station (1998)

References

External links
Arne Henriksen Arkitekter AS

Norwegian railway architects
1944 births
Living people